Now Chah or Nowchah may refer to:
 Now Chah, Mashhad
 Nowchah, Torqabeh and Shandiz